"Inta Omri" (also transliterated as , , or ) is a popular Egyptian song by Umm Kulthum. It was released in February 1964 by Sono Cairo Records.

Composition and legacy

The song (literally "You Are My Life") was composed by prominent Egyptian musician Mohamed Abd Elwahab with lyrics by Egyptian poet Ahmad Shafiq Kamel. It has been sung by many singers including Egyptian singer Amal Maher, whose voice is considered one of the closest to Umm Kulthum's. It is composed in maqam kurd, which is usually used to portray feelings of freedom, romance, and gentleness.

External links 
Umm Kulthum - Enta Omri
Amal Maher - Enta Omri
Sarit Hadad - Inta Omri
English lyrics of Inta Omri Shira.net

References

Egyptian songs
Umm Kulthum songs
1946 songs